"Out and In" is a 1969 song by the progressive rock band the Moody Blues, from their album To Our Children's Children's Children, a concept album about space travel. Prior to its release on To Our Children's Children's Children, "Out and In" was released on the B-side of the single "Watching and Waiting," the album's only single.

"Out and In" was written jointly by band members Mike Pinder and John Lodge, and it is the only Moody Blues collaboration between the two. However, on the album's subsequent release on CD in 1997, John Lodge's songwriting credit was removed, and the cover showed Pinder as sole songwriter.

In his 2017 book "Renewing the Balance", Dirk Dunbar says of the song: "'Out and In' looks beyond the planets as part of the journey toward the total view where inside and outside become one". The album was one of those listened to, on cassette tape, by the crew of Apollo 15 in 1971.

Personnel
 Mike Pinder – vocals, Mellotron, acoustic guitar
 Ray Thomas – flute, backing vocals
 Justin Hayward – acoustic and electric guitars
 John Lodge – bass guitar
 Graeme Edge – drums, percussion

References

1969 songs
The Moody Blues songs
Songs written by Mike Pinder
Songs written by John Lodge (musician)
Songs about outer space